Paul Simon Evans (born 1 September 1974) is an English-born Welsh former international football footballer. Evans played in the centre or on the right of midfield. He is currently Sports Massage Therapist as part of the backroom staff at Leeds United.

Career
Born in Oswestry, Evans started his career from Shrewsbury Town and got signed professionally in 1993 when he was 19 years old. He went on to make 238 appearances for the Gay Meadow club and scored 36 goals. West London club Brentford signed him for £110,000 in March 1999. It was while at Brentford that Evans famously scored goals in consecutive games from the halfway line, first at home to Preston North End, then at Burnley. During his time at Brentford, Evans gained his first Wales cap and the attention of higher-division clubs. He played 155 games for the club, all in the starting XI. He managed to hit the net 34 times.

It was Bradford City who got his signature when they signed him to a four year-contract on a free transfer from Brentford. He made 21 appearances in his first season with them and scored two goals. He was later loaned out to Blackpool for a couple of months, where he made 10 appearances, scoring once against Tranmere Rovers. When he returned to Bradford he forced his way into the first team due to a few of the usual performers being injured. He played another 25 games and scored another three goals. After the regulars returned to full fitness, he was loaned out again, this time to Nottingham Forest.

After one appearance at the City Ground, Forest paid £25,000 for his services on a permanent basis. He proved to be a bargain buy as he was one of the best performers in Joe Kinnear's side that was relegated at the end of the 2004–05 season. Evans is remembered at the City Ground for his goal against West Ham United shortly after Brian Clough had died. This goal set Forest on the way to victory. Shortly before their relegation, Gary Megson took charge of Forest, and in the 2005–06 season he was frozen out of Megson's plans.

After 45 appearances and four goals in his first full season with Forest, Evans was not allowed to play reserve-team football and lost his fitness as a result. Then-Rotherham United boss and former Forest caretaker boss Mick Harford took him on loan to help regain his fitness. After only four league appearances with the Millers, he suffered a knee injury. In addition to his league appearances at Rotherham he also played in and scored in a Football League Trophy tie against Macclesfield Town.

When Megson left Forest and Ian McParland and Frank Barlow took charge, Evans continued training with Forest again and played a few reserve games; however, he was released at the end of the season.

In July 2006, Evans was given a trial by Swindon Town boss Dennis Wise. He made his first appearance for the Town in a 1–1 draw against Reading and was subsequently offered a one-year deal, which he accepted. Evans soon became an integral part of Swindon's midfield, scoring a number of vital goals including a 40-yard free kick against Wrexham.

He returned to Bradford City in summer 2007, three years after leaving Valley Parade. On 29 April 2008, Evans was deemed to be surplus to requirements at Valley Parade and was released by manager Stuart McCall along with 13 other Bradford players.

He had trials with fellow League Two sides Darlington and Morecambe, as well as Oxford United of the Conference National, who he joined on a short-term contract in September 2008. He played three games for Oxford but was released in January 2009. He joined Halifax Town later the same month along with fellow Bradford City player David Brown. He made his debut against Wakefield as Halifax won 4–1, with Evans helping to make one goal and hitting the crossbar.

In August 2009, he joined Farsley Celtic.

Coaching
After retiring as a player, Evans currently works at Leeds United as part of the sports science backroom team.

Personal life 
Evans is a Liverpool supporter.

Career statistics

Honours

As a player 
Brentford
Football League Third Division: 1998–99

Shrewsbury Town
 Football League Third Division: 1993–94

As an individual 
 Football League Second Division PFA Team of the Year: 2001–02
 Football League Third Division PFA Team of the Year: 1998–99

References

External links

Paul Evans Vital Profile

1974 births
Living people
Sportspeople from Oswestry
Welsh footballers
Wales international footballers
Shrewsbury Town F.C. players
Brentford F.C. players
Bradford City A.F.C. players
Blackpool F.C. players
Nottingham Forest F.C. players
Rotherham United F.C. players
Swindon Town F.C. players
Oxford United F.C. players
FC Halifax Town players
Farsley Celtic A.F.C. players
Association football midfielders
Leeds United F.C. non-playing staff